Following the 4 October 2009 general elections in Greece, George Papandreou, the leader of PASOK, formed a government, which was sworn in on 7 October. A major cabinet reshuffle was made in September 2010. The cabinet was succeeded by the Lucas Papademos's Coalition Cabinet.

The 2009 cabinet

The cabinet has 36 members, 14 ministers and 22 deputy ministers, a reduction in the size of government as promised by the PA.SO.K. leader during his campaign for the country’s parliamentary elections. Twenty-four of the new members of the government had no previous ministerial experience. Nine of the members were women, a very large proportion by Greek standards, while five of them were named to head ministries among the 14 portfolios. Papandreou appointed himself foreign minister, a portfolio he held in a previous Pasok government.

Changes in government structure
The new cabinet features less ministries than usual in the past (four less than the previous cabinet), and significant changes in several of them:
 the post of a Vice-President of the Government has been re-introduced and given a coordinating role over the Government Council for Foreign Affairs and Defense (KYSEA) and the committee on Economic and Social Policy.
 the united Ministry for Economy and Finance has been split up again, with the Ministry for Economy also taking over the role of the Ministry for Development and most functions of the Ministry for Mercantile Marine.
 the regional ministries, namely the Ministry for Macedonia–Thrace and the Ministry for the Aegean and Island Policy, were abolished. Instead, a Deputy Minister of the Ministry of Finance, Competitiveness and Mercantile Marine resided in Macedonia.
 the Ministry for Transport and Communications was merged with the Public Works sector of the Ministry for the Environment, Physical Planning and Public Works, while a dedicated Ministry for the Environment, Energy and Climate Change is created.
 the General Secretariats of Public Order (supervising the Hellenic Police and Hellenic Fire Service) and of Civil Defence of the Ministry for the Interior, together with the Hellenic Coast Guard (previously under the purview of the Ministry for Mercantile Marine) are joined into the new Ministry for the Protection of the Citizen. In essence, it forms a revival, in a revised form, of the old Ministry for Public Order.
 the ministries of Culture and Tourism were merged.

Ministers

The 2010 cabinet
Prime Minister Papandreou's second cabinet was sworn in on 7 September 2010, after a major cabinet reshuffle with 48 cabinet members  comprising the new government, of which seven members were alternate ministers – up from two in the previous Cabinet – and 24 deputy ministers. The majority of Cabinet members are M.P.s from the ruling PA.SO.K. party. The Ministry of Maritime Affairs, Islands and Fisheries - essentially the re-established Merchant Marine ministry - was established.

Ministers

The 2011 cabinet

Prime Minister George A. Papandreou announced a Cabinet reshuffle on 15 June 2011 amidst the worsening Greek debt crisis and mounting protests. The new cabinet was announced and sworn in on 17 June. It features 41 members, seven down from the 2010 cabinet, and a new ministry, that of Administrative Reform, split off from the Interior Ministry. The Ministry for Maritime Affairs, Islands and Fisheries, established in 2010, was dissolved and merged with the Ministry for Regional Development and Competitiveness.

The new cabinet received a vote of confidence on 21 June 2011, with 155 (51.7%) votes in favour (all from PA.SO.K. members), 143 (47.7%) against, and two (0.7%) abstentions.

Ministers

Prime Minister George A. Papandreou also announced the formation of a Government Committee (Κυβερνητική Επιτροπή) composed of leading ministers:

 Dimitris Reppas
 Haris Kastanidis
 Evangelos Venizelos
 Michalis Chrysohoidis
 Giorgos Papakonstantinou
 Anna Diamantopoulou
 Giannis Ragousis
 Andreas Loverdos
 Kostas Skandalidis
 Christos Papoutsis

See also
Cabinet of Greece
List of cabinets of Greece

References

General

Specific

Cabinets of Greece
2009 in Greek politics
2010 in Greek politics
2011 in Greek politics
Greek government-debt crisis
Cabinets established in 2009
Cabinets disestablished in 2011
2009 establishments in Greece
2011 disestablishments in Greece
PASOK